Actinopus ramirezi is a species of mygalomorph spiders in the family Actinopodidae. It is found in Argentina.

References

ramirezi
Spiders described in 2018